The King of the Mountain match (Queen of the Mountain when female wrestlers are involved) is a professional wrestling match exclusive to Impact Wrestling (formerly Total Nonstop Action Wrestling).

Match format

The five competitors in the match start out as "ineligible" to win. In order to become "eligible", a wrestler must score a pinfall or submission on an opponent. The opponent who submits or is pinned is forced to spend two minutes in the "penalty box" cage. More than one wrestler can be in the cage. This often results in wrestlers fighting inside the cage or forming some sort of alliance.

Once "eligible", the wrestler may win the match by retrieving the match's prize (usually a championship belt) and hanging it on the hook suspended above the ring with the aid of ladders stationed outside the ring. An official maintains possession of the belt and circles the ring, staying out of the action as much as possible. When a wrestler wishes to hang the belt, he must retrieve it from the official. Once the belt is in play, any other wrestler who is eligible may attempt to steal the belt and hang it. Once the belt has been dropped and no wrestler is attempting to hang it, a referee returns the belt to the official.

These modified rules make King/Queen of the Mountain essentially a reverse ladder match, as the competitors attempt to hang the belt instead of retrieving it.

Stats
As of 2016, Jeff Jarrett has won the most King of the Mountain matches with three, winning the NWA World Heavyweight Championship twice in the process. Also, Samoa Joe is the only wrestler to retain a world championship (The TNA World Heavyweight Championship), while Suicide, Eric Young and Bram are the only other wrestlers to retain a championship in the match (Suicide retained the X Division Championship while Eric Young and Bram retained the King of the Mountain Championship).

Queen of the Mountain
At Slammiversary (2022), the first-ever Queen of the Mountain match took place, with Jordynne Grace defeating champion Tasha Steelz, along with Chelsea Green, Deonna Purrazzo and Mia Yim to win the Impact Knockouts Championship. Four-time Knockouts World Champion Mickie James was the match's enforcer.

Match history

King of the Mountain

Queen of the Mountain

Participant list

King of the Mountain

Queen of the Mountain

See also
 Bound for Glory Series
 Feast or Fired
 TNA Turkey Bowl

References

Professional wrestling match types
Impact Wrestling match types
2004 in professional wrestling